Venera 2MV-1 No.2, also known as Sputnik 20 in the Western world, was a Soviet spacecraft, which was launched in 1962 as part of the Venera programme. Due to a problem with its upper stage it failed to leave low Earth orbit, and reentered the atmosphere a few days later. It was the second of two Venera 2MV-1 spacecraft, both of which failed to leave Earth orbit. The previous mission, Venera 2MV-1 No.1, was launched several days earlier.

Launch 

Venera 2MV-1 No.2 was launched at 02:12:30 UTC on 1 September 1962, atop a Molniya 8K78 carrier rocket flying from Site 1/5 at the Baikonur Cosmodrome. The lower stages of the rocket operated nominally, injecting the fourth stage and payload into a low Earth orbit. Following a coast phase, the upper stage was to have ignited around sixty-one minutes and thirty seconds after launch, in order to place the spacecraft into heliocentric orbit. The ignition command did not reach the engine, however, and the fuel valves did not open, so the upper stage failed to ignite leaving the payload in geocentric orbit. It reentered the atmosphere on 6 September 1962, five days after it had been launched.

Satellite designation 

The designations Sputnik 24, and later Sputnik 20, were used by the United States Naval Space Command to identify the spacecraft in its Satellite Situation Summary documents, since the Soviet Union did not release the internal designations of its spacecraft at that time, and had not assigned it an official name due to its failure to depart Earth orbit.

See also

 List of missions to Venus

References

Spacecraft launched in 1962

Venera program
Spacecraft which reentered in 1962
2MV